Charles Heard   (January 30, 1872 – February 20, 1945) was a Major League Baseball pitcher and outfielder. He played  for the  Pittsburgh Alleghenys of the National League during the 1890 season.

Sources

Major League Baseball pitchers
Major League Baseball outfielders
Pittsburgh Alleghenys players
Baseball players from Pennsylvania
1872 births
1945 deaths
19th-century baseball players
Milwaukee Brewers (minor league) players
Milwaukee Creams players